Pedro Miguel Etxenike Landiribar, also known as Pedro Miguel Echenique (born 8 June 1950, Isaba, Navarre), is a theoretical solid-state physicist, Professor of Condensed Matter Physics at the University of the Basque Country (UPV/EHU), and former minister of the Basque Autonomous Community.

Early life and education 
Etxenike was the son of the medical doctor Pedro Etxenike and the teacher Felisa Landiribar. Growing up with one brother and one sister in a small navarrese village (with about 800 inhabitants at the time) he later attended a Capuchin boarding school  He attended the University of Navarre and graduated in Physics in 1972, receiving the Special Degree Prize and End-of-Studies Award.
In 1973 began his studies at the University of Cambridge with a March stipend. In 1976 he obtained his Ph.D. (with a thesis directed by John Pendry) and in 1977 he received (directed by Rufus Ritchie) a Doctorate in Physics from the Autonomous University of Barcelona, for which he received the Special Doctorate Prize.

Career and research 
After postdoctoral positions at the Oak Ridge National Laboratory in Tennessee and as Nordita Fellow of the Niels Bohr Institute in Copenhagen and with stays at Lund University he became Professor of Solid State Physics at the University of Barcelona in 1978. In 1980 he stepped down from this position to join the government of the Basque Autonomous Region. In 1984 he returned to academia as a visiting lecturer at the Cavendish Laboratory in Cambridge. In 1986 he moved back to the Basque Country as Professor of Condensed Matter Physics at the University of the Basque Country (UPV/EHU) at its campus in Donostia / San Sebastián. Since 1999 he is also president of the Donostia International Physics Center (DIPC).

Etxenike has co-authored over 400 scientific articles. His research has focused on explaining the behaviour of solid bodies and their interaction with beams of charged particles. His work has opened new lines of research and has stimulated innovative theoretical and experimental lines of work in very diverse fields of condensed matter physics such as electron and tunnel microscopy, physical chemistry on the femtosecond scale, electronic surface localization, reverse photo-emission, atomic collisions, the interaction of ions with plasma particles, ion implantation and surface excitations in superfluid helium.

Many works, starting with his PhD thesis in Cambridge study the interaction of electrons, atoms, and ions with surfaces. An important concept introduced and developed by Etxenike are image-potential states at metal surfaces  in which electrons can be trapped in the potential of their own image charge. Etxenike and co-workers computed and analyzed these states for many different materials and surfaces as well as their interaction with surface excitations such as surface plasmons, surface plasmon polaritons, and surface phonons. Etxenike is co-author of a highly cited review on the theory of surface plasmons

They analyzed theoretically the technique of scanning tunneling microscopy (STM) in order to interpret STM images and, in particular, relate them to the topography of the studied surfaces and to the spectroscopy of surface states ("scanning tunneling spectroscopy").

More recent works study topological insulators, attosecond physics, and quantum plasmonics.

Etxenike has directed 27 PhD theses. Among his former students are Javier Aizpurua, Ricardo Dièz Muiño, and José María Pitarke.

Notable are also Etxenike interest and ability in disseminating scientific and technological knowledge and making it more accessible to society at large. He has been very active in this field in recent years, giving numerous lectures in different university, cultural and business forums, at which he has always defended the cultural value of scientific activity and encouraged young people to pursue science. He has co-organized outreach activities such as since 2010 the triennial festival "Passion for Knowledge" in San Sebastián.

Publications

Honors and awards
 1998 Premio Principe de Asturias 
 1998 Max-Planck Forschungspreis (of Max Planck Society and Alexander von Humboldt Foundation)
 2002 Medalla de Oro de la Real Sociedad Española de Física
 2005 Premio Nacional de Investigación Blas Cabrera
 2014 he was elected to the Spanish Royal Academy of Sciences, becoming a full member (Académico numerario) in 2017 
 2018 honorary member of the European Physical Society
 He is Fellow of the American Physical Society (since 1990)  and foreign member of the Royal Academy of Science, Letters and Fine Arts of Belgium.
 He received many honours in the Basque Country and Navarre, among them the Premio Vasco Universal by the Basque Government (1999), the gold medals of UPV/EHU (1998), of San Sebastián (2000), of Gipuzkoa (2010), and of Navarre (2016), and he is "favoured son" (Hijo Predilecto) of his native town Isaba (1998).
 He has received honorary doctorates from the universities of Cambridge (D. Sc. in 1998), Complutense de Madrid, Valladolid, Navarra, Aalto (2016), and of the Universidad Autónoma de Santo Domingo (2017).

Political activity 
In 1980 he gave up his professorship in Barcelona to join the first government of the Basque Autonomous Community after the Francoist dictatorship. In the government of Carlos Garaikoetxea he first served as Minister of Education and in 1983 he became Minister of Education and Culture and Spokesman for the Government until the end of the legislative period in 1984.

One of the milestones in this legislative period was the law on the normalisation of the use of Basque, for which Etxenike was the driving force and proponent. These early years of the Department of Education were also crucial in putting in place most of the foundations in the education system of the Basque Autonomous Community, including freedom of education. The setting up of R&D centres and the internationalization of study scholarships were also promoted. 
 
After leaving government politics, Etxenike continues to play an important role in the science policy of the Basque country. He was central in founding and leading a number of centers, agencies, and initiatives that are now leading research institutions in the Basque country. He is the founder and first president of Donostia International Physics Center (DIPC), founded in 1999. He was a promoter and creator of the mixed CSIC-UPV/EHU centre, the Centre for Materials Physics (CFM) and was its first director (1999-2001) and is still president of the Materials Physics Center associated with CFM. He played a similar role for the Cooperative Research Centre CIC nanoGUNE (founded 2009) and is (in 2019) chairman of its Governing Board.

In 2007 he was among the founders of the Academy of Sciences, Arts and Letters of the Basque Country Jakiunde and served as its first president until 2012. He then was named Honorary Chairman.
Other positions held include membership of the governing board of the CSIC (Spanish National Research Council) (2001-2007), deputy chairperson of the board of the franco-spanish Euskampus Foundation, and vice-chairmanship of the innovation agency of the Basque government, Innobasque (2008-2012). Since 2012 he chairs the panel of judges of the Princess-of-Asturias-Prize for Scientific and Technical Research.

References

External links 
 
 
 
Etxenike's publications 
An interview on Euskonews
The webpage of the DIPC
  (long, biographical interview)
 
 

1950 births
Living people
Government ministers of the Basque Country (autonomous community)
People from Roncal-Salazar
Academic staff of the University of the Basque Country
University of Navarra alumni
Spanish physicists
Autonomous University of Barcelona alumni
Alumni of the University of Cambridge
Fellows of the American Physical Society
Fellows of the American Association for the Advancement of Science
Members of the Royal Spanish Academy